Borinquen is one of the 3 subbarrios in the barrio of Oriente in San Juan, Puerto Rico. Its population in 2010 was 1,290.

References

Oriente, San Juan, Puerto Rico
Municipality of San Juan